This is a list of inhabited localities in Kaliningrad Oblast, Russia, with their former names in German, Polish, and Lithuanian.  After the former German regions of East Prussia were annexed to the Soviet Union as an exclave of the Russian SFSR, nearly all toponyms were given new Russian names.

Major cities and towns

Other localities

See also
List of cities and towns in East Prussia
List of German places names for the inhabited localities in Kaliningrad Oblast
List of Belarusian exonyms for places in Kaliningrad Oblast

Further reading
.   (Letas Palmaitis.  Proposition on Russifying Original Toponyms of the Northern Part of Former East Prussia). 2003. 

Geography of Kaliningrad Oblast
Lists of populated places
Kaliningrad
Kaliningrad